The 2011 FINA Women's Water Polo World League was the eighth edition of the event, organised by the world's governing body in aquatics, the FINA. After playing in groups within the same continent, eight teams qualify to play in a final tournament, called the Super Final in Tianjin, China from June 14 to June 19, 2011.

Super Final 
 June, 14 – June 19, 2011, Tianjin, China

Seeding

Knockout stage

Semifinals

All times are CST (UTC+8)

Bronze medal match

All times are CST (UTC+8)

Final

All times are CST (UTC+8)

5th–8th Places

Final ranking 

Team Roster
Betsey Armstrong, Heather Petri, Melissa Seidemann, Brenda Villa(C), Lauren Wenger, Courtney Mathewson, Jessica Steffens, Lolo Silver, Elsie Windes, Kelly Rulon, Annika Dries, Kami Craig, Tumua Anae, Maggie Steffens, Anne Belden. Head coach: Adam Krikorian.

Individual awards
Top Scorer
 — 14 goals
Media All Star Team
 — Goalkeaper
 — Center Forward

References

2011
International water polo competitions hosted by China
World League, women
Fina